Rejoice is the fifth album by Welsh mezzo-soprano Katherine Jenkins, released on 19 November 2007, in the UK. It charted at number 3 on the UK Albums Chart.

Track listing
 "Rejoice" written by Steve Mac/Wayne Hector
 "I (Who Have Nothing)" Carlo Donida, Mogol, Jerry Leiber, Mike Stoller
 "Sancta Maria"
 "Secret Love"
 "Le cose che sei per me"
 "How Do You Leave the One You Love" written by Steve Mac/Jörgen Elofsson/John Reid
 "Requiem for a Soldier"
 "Somewhere"
 "Shout in Silence" written by Gary Barlow/Andy Hill
 "Be Still My Soul"
 "Kiss from a Rose" 
 "I Will Pray for You" written by Steve Mac/Blair Daly/Chris Farren
 "Viva Tonight" written by Gary Barlow/Andy Hill

Charts

Weekly charts

Year-end charts

Certifications

References

Katherine Jenkins albums
2007 classical albums
Universal Classics and Jazz albums